Philip Cavener (born 2 June 1961) is an English former professional footballer who played as a winger. He played in the Football League for Burnley, Bradford City, Gillingham, Northampton Town and Peterborough United, in Sweden for Karlskrona, and in the National League for Kettering Town.

References

1961 births
Living people
Sportspeople from Tynemouth
Footballers from Tyne and Wear
English footballers
Association football wingers
Wallsend Boys Club players
Burnley F.C. players
Bradford City A.F.C. players
Gillingham F.C. players
FK Karlskrona players
Northampton Town F.C. players
Peterborough United F.C. players
Kettering Town F.C. players
English Football League players
National League (English football) players